The 2018 Derby City Council election took place on 3 May 2018 to elect members of Derby City Council in England. This was on the same day as other local elections.  The Labour group on the council suffered losses of both the Council Leader Ranjit Banwait and the mayor John Whitby, as well as then cabinet member Sara Bolton, who lost by over 1,000 votes to Conservative Rob Cooper. Labour lost its overall majority on the council, and a Conservative minority administration was formed with Liberal Democrat and UKIP backing.

Election results

All comparisons in vote share are to the corresponding 2014 election.

Ward results

Abbey

Allestree

Alvaston

Arboretum

Blagreaves

Boulton

Chaddesden

Chellaston

Darley

Derwent

Note: Derwent ward was won by UKIP at the previous regular election in 2014, but gained by the Conservatives in a by-election on 9 March 2017.

Littleover

Mackworth

Mickleover

Normanton

Oakwood

Sinfin

Spondon

References

`

2018 English local elections
2018
2010s in Derby